Frank James Griffin (1 April 1919 – 5 June 2016) was an Irish judge who served as a Judge of the Supreme Court from 1973 to 1991.

Griffin was a Judge-in-Residence at University College Dublin in the Sutherland School of Law. From 1991 to 1996, he served as President of the Council of the Royal Victoria Eye and Ear Hospital. His son, Gerry Griffin, serves as judge on the Irish Circuit Court. He died in 2016, at the age of 97.

References

Judges of the Supreme Court of Ireland
20th-century Irish lawyers
1919 births
2016 deaths